Berw Road Halt railway station served the district of Trallwn (Welsh: Trallwng), in Pontypridd, in the historical county of Glamorganshire, Wales, from 1904 to 1932 on the Pont Shon Norton section of the Llancaiach Branch.

History 
The station was opened as Berw Road Platform on 17 October 1904 by the Taff Vale Railway. It closed on 1 July 1906 but later reopened on a different site in July 1908, although the company notice of 10 September 1907 said that it was ready for use. Its name was changed to Berw Road Halt on 2 October 1922. It closed on 12 September 1932.

References 

Disused railway stations in Carmarthenshire
Railway stations in Great Britain opened in 1904
Railway stations in Great Britain closed in 1906
Railway stations in Great Britain opened in 1908
Railway stations in Great Britain closed in 1932
1904 establishments in Wales
1932 disestablishments in Wales
Former Taff Vale Railway stations